Federal Neuro-Psychiatric Hospital, Calabar is a federal government of Nigeria speciality hospital located in Calabar, Cross River State, Nigeria. The current chief medical director is Bassey Edet.

History 
Federal Neuro-Psychiatric Hospital, Calabar was established on 1903.

CMD 
The current chief medical director is Bassey Edet.

References 

Hospitals in Nigeria